The Grafting is the third solo album by Christian rock singer and former Petra frontman, John Schlitt. The album was released on January 22, 2008 through TAG Artist Group. It was produced by Dan Needham, who is Schlitt's son-in-law.

The album release was marked by a premiere performance by Schlitt of the tracks "The Grafting" and "Only Men" from the album on the Celebration program, which was aired internationally by the Daystar Television Network. The program also included an interview with Schlitt. The videos of Schlitt's performances of these two songs is available for download at his official website.

Background and production

John Schlitt hinted at a third solo album as early as 1999 during an interview for the Petra Rocks My World website. In the interview, which happened three years after the release of his second solo album, Unfit for Swine, Schlitt said "I don't know when, but I'd like to do it [release a third solo album] as quickly as possible. It'll be after I feel this new Petra has gotten back on their feet." In a second interview for the same website, held in 2005 after Petra had announced its retirement, Schlitt confirmed that there were some tracks already mixed, and that "it will finally get finished."

In 2007, Schlitt finished the recording of The Grafting, and also signed with Fused Management. The new album was produced by Schlitt's son-in-law Dan Needham. Schlitt said about the album that "the music itself is going down a whole new path; the fact that my interests have changed as I have grown older is reflected in [it]." According to him, the album covers topics like adoption, divorce, and poverty, among others. Schlitt also described the album as "more personal and emotional" than his previous albums.

Reception

Wayne Myatt, from Jesus Freak Hideout, gave the album 3.5 stars (out of 5) in his review. He wrote that although the album had an "inconsistent feel to it as though it was a project worked on over a period of time" it was worth a listen. He added that The Grafting "will definitely please fans of Petra who are longing for a substitute".

Freelance writer Tracy Darlington praised Schlitt's vocals writing that although the album "could be considered a softer rock album than Schlitt’s first two solo endeavors, his signature vocals still bring the rock feel home."

Track listing
All songs written by Dan Needham, except where noted.
 "Stand" (Mark Heimermann, Schlitt, Kevan Cajka, Needham) - 4:08
 "Keep Your Light On" - 3:25
 "Only Men" - 4:26
 "Face of God" (Cajka, Scott Faircloff, Needham) - 4:20
 "The Grafting" - 3:51
 "First Song" (Cajka, Needham) - 3:55
 "Your Eyes" (Heimermann, Marc Martel, Cajka, Needham) - 4:25
 "Lord Have Mercy" (Steve Merkel) - 4:02
 "Gravity" - 4:16
 "Carry On" - 4:50

Personnel 

 John Schlitt – vocals
 Dan Needham – programming (1, 2, 3, 7, 9, 10), drums, guitars (2), additional backing vocals (2, 3), keyboards (3, 4, 8), acoustic guitar (3, 5, 6, 8), percussion (5), hi-strung acoustic guitar (5), bass (6), acoustic piano (7, 10), all instruments (9)
 Blair Masters – programming (5), string arrangements (5)
 Gary Burnette – guitars (1, 4, 7, 10)
 Jerry McPherson – guitars (3, 6), electric guitar (8)
 David Cleveland – electric guitar (5)
 Mark Hill – bass (1, 4, 7, 10)
 Joey Canaday – bass (2, 3, 8)
 Matt Pierson – bass (5)
 Kari Needham – backing vocals (2, 8), vocal intro (8)

Production
 Dan Needham – producer, tracking engineer, mixing at Brownstone Recording, Brentwood, Tennessee
 Danny Duncan – tracking engineer
 Dan Shike – mastering at Tone and Volume Mastering, Nashville, Tennessee
 Erick Anderson – photography
 Kari Needham – illustration
 Stephen Boatright – graphic design

References

John Schlitt albums
2008 albums